Mohamed Latif ( 23 October 1909 – 17 March 1990) was an Egyptian professional footballer. He played for the clubs Al-Zamalek of Egypt and Rangers F.C. of Scotland, as well as for the Egyptian national team.

Career
Latif helped the Egyptian national team qualify for the 1934 World Cup, scoring three goals against the Mandatory Palestine football team during the qualification rounds. He also played at the finals tournament in Egypt's only match, against Hungary.

After the World Cup, Latif came to Glasgow, as did goalkeeper Mustafa Mansour, possibly at the suggestion of Egypt's national coach, Scotsman James McRea. He played his only Scottish League match for Rangers in the 1935/36 season, against Hibs.

In 1936, he was part of the Egyptian team that played in the Olympic tournament in Berlin.

He then worked as Zamalek coach in the 1950s and later. He is most well known for his role as a sports announcer for decades prior to his retirement and subsequent departure.

References

External links

1909 births
1990 deaths
Egyptian footballers
Egypt international footballers
Olympic footballers of Egypt
Footballers at the 1936 Summer Olympics
Rangers F.C. players
Zamalek SC players
1934 FIFA World Cup players
Egyptian expatriate footballers
Zamalek SC managers
Expatriate footballers in Scotland
Scottish Football League players
Association football forwards
Egyptian expatriate sportspeople in the United Kingdom
Egyptian football managers
Sports commentators